Vaninsky (masculine), Vaninskaya (feminine), or Vaninskoye (neuter) is the name of several rural localities in Russia:
Vaninskaya, a village in Oparinsky District of Kirov Oblast
Vaninskoye, Kirov Oblast, a village in Podosinovsky District of Kirov Oblast
Vaninskoye, Yaroslavl Oblast, a village in Nekouzsky District of Yaroslavl Oblast

See also
Vanino